{{Infobox indoor American football team
| name = Omaha Beef
| logo = Omaha Beef logo.png
| founded = 1999
| folded =
| city = Liberty First Credit Union Arena in Omaha, Nebraska
| misc = BeefFootball.com
| uniform =
| colors = Orange, black, silver  
| owner = Ricky BertzCraig Tirey
| general manager = Nick Tomlinson
| president = Dominic Montero
| coach = Rayshaun Kizer
| mascot = Sir Loin
| cheerleaders = Prime Dancers
| nicknames =
| league =
Indoor Professional Football League (2000–2001)
National Indoor Football League (2002–2004)
Pacific Conference (2002–2004)
Northern Division (2002–2004)
United Indoor Football (2005–2008)
Western Division (2006–2008)
Indoor Football League (2009–2012)
United Conference (2009–2012)
Central Division (2009)
Central West Division (2010)
Great Plains Division (2011)
Champions Professional Indoor Football League (2013–2014)
Champions Indoor Football (2015–present)
Northern Division (2016)
North Conference (2017–2019)
| team_history =
Omaha Beef (2000–present)
| no_league_champs = 1
| league_champs =
 2021
| no_conf_champs = 1
| conf_champs =
2017
| no_div_champs = 2
| div_champs =
 2001, 2003
| no_playoff_appearances = 16
| playoff_appearances =
 2000, 2001, 2002, 2003, 2004, 2005, 2006, 2007, 2008, 2009, 2010, 2011, 2013, 2017, 2019, 2021
| arena_years =
 Omaha Civic Auditorium (1999–2012)
 Liberty First Credit Union Arena (2013–present)
}}
The Omaha Beef''' is an indoor football team and a charter member of the Champions Indoor Football (CIF) league. Based in Omaha, Nebraska, the Beef play their home games at Liberty First Credit Union Arena in nearby Ralston.

History

First 13 seasons
Omaha originally played in the Indoor Professional Football League in 2000 and 2001 as an expansion team. The Beef made the playoffs their first and second seasons, advancing to the 2001 IPFL Championship. With the IPFL folding, the Beef moved to the National Indoor Football League (NIFL) on October 10, 2001. The Beef then joined the newly formed United Indoor Football (UIF) in 2005 as a charter member. In 2008, the UIF merged with the Intense Football League to create the Indoor Football League.

From 2009 to 2011, the organization went through several general manager and head coaching changes.  Despite those changes, the team finished in the top tier of the league.  In 2009, James Kerwin was head coach of the Beef and led the team to a 12–2 record and to the second round of the IFL playoffs.  The Beef continued their consecutive playoff qualification streak, which ended after 14 years across five leagues when the Beef failed to qualify for the playoffs in 2014.

The organization entered their thirteenth year of existence and fourth year as a member of the IFL in 2012. Despite constant changes within the league, of expansion and contraction, the Beef were a constant and competitive member.  During the 2012 season, ownership of the team was then taken over by the league.  The head coach was let go during season and several other changes were made to cut costs. Despite this, Andy Yost and James Kerwin took over as co-head coaches and the Beef qualified for the playoffs with some key wins.  The IFL decided to not allow Omaha in the playoffs. This resulted in the ending of a 12-year playoff appearance streak.

In December 2012, the Omaha Beef was accepted by the CPIFL to begin play in March 2013.  The Beef posted a 123–65 (.654) record up to this time.

Cornhusker Beef, Inc. ownership (2013–2018)
In December 2012, the Omaha Beef were bought by Cornhusker Beef, Inc. On December 6, 2012, the Beef announced the new ownership group composing of Rich Tokhiem, Gerard Daly, and Jim Tokhiem.

In their first season in the Champions Professional Indoor Football League (CPIFL), the Beef hired Andy Yost as head coach, who had finished the previous season as interim co-head coach.  Yost led the Beef to a 10–2 record and qualified for the playoffs, as they finished second, in a three-way tie (Sioux City (1), Wichita (3)) in the league.  The Beef fell to Wichita 31–25.

After leading the team to the playoffs in 2013, Yost moved from head coach to quarterback coach for the 2014 season. The Beef hired Steve Heimann as head coach and he coached the Beef to a win in their 2014 exhibition game. However, he then resigned before coaching a regular season game. The Beef promoted defensive coordinator Dan Thurin to head coach. The Beef finished with a record of 4–8, which was an all-time franchise worst at that time.

On January 7, 2015, the Beef announced that former Cornhusker and NFL veteran Cory Ross would be the head coach for the 2015 season.  Ross previously coached the Lincoln Haymakers of the CPIFL, also owned by Beef owner Rich Tokhiem, which ceased operations after the 2014 season.

In 2015 season, the Beef started playing in Champions Indoor Football (CIF), created by the merger of the CPIFL with the Lone Star Football League (LSFL).

Omaha opened 2015 with their worst start in franchise history at 0–5.  On April 1, defensive coordinator Demetrius Ross opined that the Beef's poor start was in part due to preparations beginning in January instead of October and that the coaches did not get to select the players that they wanted. The Beef finished the 2015 season with a record of 1–11, their worst record in franchise history. The Beef also finished in ninth place in the nine-team CIF, marking the first time the Beef ever finished last in a league.  In their 11 losses, the Beef lost by an average of 25.0 points per game, were last in the league in points with given up at 672 (56.0/game), points scored at 395 (32.9/game), and a turnover differential of –16.

In 2016, the Omaha Beef took advantage of their schedule to improve their record to 7–5.  Omaha played six of their 12 games against first year franchises (Chicago Eagles and Salina Liberty) in which the Beef recorded five of their seven wins.  Omaha only had one win over a team with a winning record when they played (Wichita Force 4–1 on April 16) and only played three games all season against teams that came into the contest with a winning record.  In the Beef's seven wins, the opponent's combined 2016 records were 29–54.  Despite playoff expansion for the CIF in 2016, where half of all teams in the league qualified for the playoffs, the Beef failed to make the playoffs for the third year in a row, the longest playoff drought in franchise history.

The 2017 season saw the team return to the playoffs.  The Beef took advantage of an again increased playoff field, where the top four of seven division teams qualified for the playoffs, a schedule with five of 12 games against first-year expansion teams and a division with three, first-year expansion teams, to qualify for the 2017 playoffs.  Omaha was outscored by their opponents during the regular season and only played four games against teams with winning records at the time of the game, winning only one (Bloomington on March 18) and dropping three (Sioux City on March 31, Sioux City on May 27, and Dallas on June 3). Omaha's seven regular season wins came against teams with a combined 2017 record of 25–59.  The Beef's wins during the 2016 and 2017 seasons came against teams with a combined 54–113 record. Omaha qualified as the North Division representative for the CIF Championship game.  The South division saw six of the seven teams post winning regular season records as the Texas Revolution came out of the tougher division for the Champions Bowl III bid.  Texas controlled most of the championship game, never trailing.  The Revolution played conservatively in the fourth quarter, with a 30-point lead to defeat the Beef 59–49 and claim the league title.

Prior to the 2018 season, and for the second time under this ownership, after qualifying for the playoffs, the head coach left the position before the following season. On August 16, 2017, head coach Cory Ross was announced as the head coach for the CIF expansion Quad City Steamwheelers.  Victor Mann was named head coach, who had led the Texas Revolution to the league championship in 2017.  Despite being a centerpiece in the Beef's off-season marketing campaign, days before the opening of the 2018 season, the Omaha Beef announced that Mike Bonner would be head coach for the upcoming season with Mann never coaching a game for the Beef.  Four games into the 2018 season, though a public announcement was not made by the organization at the time, players confirmed that Mike Bonner was removed from the head coach position and Rod Miller, the assistant head coach and former Beef head coach, was appointed head coach before Omaha's fifth game of the season.  Bonner was head coach for only four games, posting a 1–3 record, including losing the last three by a combined five points.  Miller became the seventh person to hold the position over the previous six seasons.  Midway through the season, Omaha suspended starting quarterback Anthony Iannotti.  Iannotti led the Beef to the 2017 Champions Bowl, where he started 14 out of 15 games.  Iannotti was later released.  Omaha finished the season losing four out of the last five games and posting a 4–8 record, tied for second worst in franchise history with the 2014 season.  The Beef failed to qualify for the playoffs for the fourth time in five seasons, the longest stretch in franchise history.

The Beef only qualified for the playoffs twice under this ownership group and posted a 33–39 (.458) regular season record. This is the only ownership group that has posted a non-winning record.

Ricky Bertz and Craig Tirey ownership (2019–present)
During the 2018 offseason, the Beef were for sale. On October 24, 2018, the Beef announced the new owners as Ricky Bertz, a founder of the CIF, and Craig Tirey.  On November 6, 2018, the Beef announced that James Kerwin would return as head coach for the 2019 season.

Rivalries
Omaha has rivalries with the Sioux City Bandits (since the NIFL days) and the Sioux Falls Storm, which also moved from the NIFL to the IFL. Omaha's rivalry with Sioux City has become one-sided, as the Bandits have defeated the Beef in 14 of their last 17 meetings,.  A new rivalry developed when the IFL expanded to Grand Island, Nebraska, in 2011 as the Nebraska Danger creating the I-80 rivalry.  However, Sioux Falls and Nebraska stayed in the IFL (Indoor Football League) when the Beef moved to the CPIFL before the 2013 season.

Season-by-season

Players

Current roster

Awards and honors
The following is a list of all Beef players who have won league Awards

Non-player personnel
The Beef organization have the only all-male dance team in indoor football, the Rump Roasters, along with an all-female dance team, the Prime dancers. The Prime dancers have won several awards including the best dance team three times in the UIF and 2009 dance team of the year in the IFL. They are ambassadors for the Beef organization as well and perform in conjunction with the Rumproasters. The Prime were named Dance team of the Year once again for 2012.

The mascot for the Beef is an Angus bull named Sir Loin. He won mascot of the year three times in UIF and was named 2009 Mascot of the year in the IFL. He was named Mascot of the Year for 2011 and again in 2012.

Past seasons

2013

2014

2018

2019

2020

2021

References

External links
 Omaha Beef official site

 
1999 establishments in Nebraska